Toni Šunjić (born 15 December 1988) is a Bosnian professional footballer who plays as a centre-back for Chinese Super League club Henan Songshan Longmen.

Šunjić started his professional career at Zrinjski Mostar, who loaned him to Kortrijk in 2010. In 2012, he joined Zorya Luhansk. Two years later, he moved to Kuban Krasnodar. The following year, he was transferred to VfB Stuttgart, who sent him on loan to Palermo in 2017. Šunjić signed with Dynamo Moscow later that year. In 2020, he switched to Beijing Guoan. Later that year, he went on a loan to Henan Songshan Longmen, with whom he signed permanently a year later.

A former youth international for Bosnia and Herzegovina, Šunjić made his senior international debut in 2012, earning over 40 caps until 2020. He represented the nation at their first major championship, the 2014 FIFA World Cup.

Club career

Early career
Šunjić came through youth academy of his hometown club Zrinjski Mostar. He made his professional debut in UEFA Europa League qualifier against Partizan on 2 August 2007 at the age of 18. On 3 August 2008, he scored his first professional goal in a triumph over Borac Banja Luka. In August 2010, he was sent on a season-long loan to Belgian outfit Kortrijk.

In January 2012, Šunjić joined Ukrainian team Zorya Luhansk.

In July 2014, he switched to Russian side Kuban Krasnodar.

VfB Stuttgart
In August 2015, Šunjić was transferred to German outfit VfB Stuttgart for an undisclosed fee. He made his official debut for the team against Hertha BSC on 12 September and managed to score a goal.

Despite VfB Stuttgart's relegation to 2. Bundesliga in May 2016, Šunjić decided to stay at the club.

In January 2017, he was loaned to Italian side Palermo until the end of season.

Dynamo Moscow
In June, Šunjić signed a two-year deal with Dynamo Moscow. He made his competitive debut for the club on 18 July against Spartak Moscow. On 3 November, he scored his first goal for Dynamo Moscow against Ural.

In June 2019, he extended his contract until June 2021.

Later stage of career
In September 2020, Šunjić moved to Chinese team Beijing Guoan, who sent him on a three-month loan to Henan Songshan Longmen, with an option to make the transfer permanent, which was activated in January 2021.

International career

Šunjić was a member of Bosnia and Herzegovina under-21 team for several years.

In August 2012, he received his first senior call-up, for a friendly game against Wales, and debuted in that game on 17 August.

In June 2014, Šunjić was named in Bosnia and Herzegovina's squad for 2014 FIFA World Cup, country's first major competition. He made his tournament debut in the second group match against Nigeria on 22 June.

On 31 August 2017, in a 2018 FIFA World Cup qualifier against Cyprus, Šunjić scored his first senior international goal.

He retired from international football on 24 June 2021.

Personal life
Šunjić has a daughter named Stefani with his long-time girlfriend Viktoria.

Career statistics

Club

International

Scores and results list Bosnia and Herzegovina's goal tally first, score column indicates score after each Šunjić goal.

Honours
Zrinjski Mostar
Bosnian Premier League: 2008–09
Bosnian Cup: 2007–08

References

External links

1988 births
Living people
Sportspeople from Mostar
Croats of Bosnia and Herzegovina
Bosnia and Herzegovina footballers
Bosnia and Herzegovina under-21 international footballers
Bosnia and Herzegovina international footballers
Bosnia and Herzegovina expatriate footballers
Association football central defenders
HŠK Zrinjski Mostar players
K.V. Kortrijk players
FC Zorya Luhansk players
FC Kuban Krasnodar players
VfB Stuttgart players
Palermo F.C. players
FC Dynamo Moscow players
Beijing Guoan F.C. players
Henan Songshan Longmen F.C. players
Premier League of Bosnia and Herzegovina players
Belgian Pro League players
Ukrainian Premier League players
Russian Premier League players
Bundesliga players
2. Bundesliga players
Serie A players
Chinese Super League players
Expatriate footballers in Belgium
Expatriate footballers in Ukraine
Expatriate footballers in Russia
Expatriate footballers in Germany
Expatriate footballers in Italy
Expatriate footballers in China
Bosnia and Herzegovina expatriate sportspeople in Belgium
Bosnia and Herzegovina expatriate sportspeople in Ukraine
Bosnia and Herzegovina expatriate sportspeople in Russia
Bosnia and Herzegovina expatriate sportspeople in Germany
Bosnia and Herzegovina expatriate sportspeople in Italy
Bosnia and Herzegovina expatriate sportspeople in China
2014 FIFA World Cup players